Sinjajevina, also known as Sinjavina is a mountain in northern Montenegro.

Features

Sinjajevina Mountain stretches from SE to NW, between town of Kolašin and village of Njegovuđa, near Žabljak. The massif is 40 km long and 15 km wide. 

Geologically, its composition is cretaceous limestone. The high mountain plain averages  in height, with only a few peaks of higher elevation.

Peaks

The highest peaks of Mt Sinjajevina are:

 Jablanov vrh 
 Torna 
 Gradiste 
 Sto 
 Savina greda 
 Veliki Pecarac 
 Veliki Starac 
 Babin vrh 
 Sto 
 Korman 
 Mali Starac

Lakes

Mt Sinjajevina is home to two lakes, both in a process of natural extinction:

 Zabojsko Lake
 Zminičko Lake

See also
Durmitor
Kolašin

External links
 SummitPost: Sinjajevina

Mountains of Montenegro
Two-thousanders of Montenegro